Gilberto Víctor Figueira, nicknamed Uaué, (born 25 January 1988) is an Angolan handball player for Marinha de Guerra and the Angolan national team.

He participated at the 2017 World Men's Handball Championship.

References

1988 births
Living people
Angolan male handball players
African Games silver medalists for Angola
African Games medalists in handball
Competitors at the 2015 African Games